Ernesto Fajardo (November 6, 1933 – January 18, 2022), better known by his stage name Don Pepot, or simply Pepot, was a Filipino comedian, actor, radio host and writer.

Early career
In the early years of his career, he was simply known as Pepot. Before his showbiz career he appeared in a travelling comedy show where he was in tandem with the late Apeng Daldal.

Awards
He was awarded the Lou Salvador Sr. Memorial Award at the 2005 FAMAS Awards.

Later career
In 2014, rumours on social media surfaced about his death. Fajardo issued a statement denying this, clarifying that he was retired in Malabon.

Death
Pepot died on January 18, 2022, at the age of 88. He died at the Veteran Memorial Hospital due to pneumonia brought on by COVID-19.

Filmography

References

External links

1933 births
2022 deaths
ABS-CBN personalities
Deaths from the COVID-19 pandemic in the Philippines
Filipino male comedians
Filipino male film actors
Male actors from Metro Manila
People from Malabon